Reid–Hillview Airport of Santa Clara County  is in the eastern part of San Jose, in Santa Clara County, California, United States.  It is owned by Santa Clara County and is near the Evergreen district of San Jose where aviation pioneer John J. Montgomery experimented with gliders in 1911. Reid–Hillview Airport was also the official general aviation airport for the 2015 Super Bowl in Levi's Stadium (in nearby Santa Clara, CA).

Reid–Hillview is a general aviation airport; there is no scheduled airline service. As with most general aviation airports air charter operations are available. The airport has a control tower that operates 7 a.m. to 10 p.m. local time. The FAA classifies Reid–Hillview as a reliever airport for San Jose International Airport.

History 
Groundbreaking for Reid–Hillview airport came in 1937. Bob and Cecil Reid built the Garden City Airport in 1935, which was quickly closed to make room for U.S. Route 101. Their second site was northwest of the Hillview golf course, hence the name. Until 1946, the single runway was unpaved.

Reid–Hillview was a single runway airport until 1965, when a second runway was added. The control tower opened in October 1967.

The airport was the origin for an emergency supply airlift to the Watsonville Municipal Airport following the 1989 Loma Prieta earthquake, after mountain and coastal roads were blocked, cutting off Santa Cruz and Watsonville from relief efforts by ground. The Watsonville Airport estimates that it received  of supplies via the airlift during the week following the quake. John McAvoy and Bill Dunn of the Reid–Hillview Airport Association received the 1990 Grand Award from the Bay Area's Metropolitan Transportation Commission for organizing the airlift. The airport continues to be used in emergency operations, including during the SCU Lightning Complex fires in 2020.

Santa Clara County published an over 120-page master plan proposing improvements and expansions at Reid–Hillview. In the mid-2000s, the county announced they would demolish the second story of the airport terminal to make room for new offices for airport administration. They failed to follow up on this plan, and the second story has been sitting idle ever since. In the document, the county also planned on adding small expansions to the runway to allow turboprops and small business jets to land. Although turboprops and small business jets still land in the current runway, this minor expansion will allow a larger flow of these type of aircraft to land.

In 2010, San Jose State University's aviation program relocated to Reid–Hillview. The university operates out of the Swift Building, where it holds classes during the academic year.

In 2018, the Board of Supervisors voted to study consolidating general aviation at San Martin Airport. On December 4, 2018, and again the following year, the board voted against accepting additional Federal Aviation Administration (FAA) funding that would have been contingent on Reid–Hillview's continued operation through 2051. Previously accepted grants require the county to keep the airport open through 2031. In November 2020, it voted to begin the process of closing the airport in 2031 and redeveloping the land.

Between 2019 and 2020, Santa Clara County undertook a community process to explore possible future uses for the airport site, resulting in a draft Reid–Hillview Vision Plan with the following vision statement:

This East San Jose neighborhood will be a place of empowerment built on our culture, diversity and history, and sustained by education, well-being, and economic opportunity for the community.

In August 2021, Santa Clara County released a study that found elevated blood lead levels in children living near the airport. On August 16, 2021, airport officials responded to the study by announcing that fixed base operators would switch to unleaded aviation fuel. After which Santa Clara County's supervisor, Cindy Chavez, testified at the United States House Oversight Subcommittee on Environment in opposition of the national use of leaded aviation fuel. The hearing resulted in the committee committing to declaring leaded aviation fuel a health hazard by 2023. On August 18, the Board of Supervisors voted unanimously to close the airport as soon as the FAA approves of its closure, which would be no sooner than January 1, 2022, and mandate the use of unleaded fuel as soon as possible. The board also voted against funding an expansion of San Martin Airport, raising concerns that general aviation traffic would be diverted to San Jose International Airport, which is also capacity-constrained and surrounded by urban development, including the low-income, minority Washington-Guadalupe and Alviso neighborhoods.

Environmental impact 
For years, local activists have pushed to close the airport, supported by Santa Clara County Supervisors Blanca Alvarado and Cindy Chavez. Residents and officials have cited the airport's proximity to 21 schools and childcare centers as a concern due to the airport's use of 100LL avgas, which contains lead. Activists consider the airport's continued operation to be an example of environmental racism in the United States, arguing that 97% of the adjacent East San Jose neighborhood at risk of lead poisoning identifies as predominantly non white, predominantly low-income Latino and Vietnamese-American residents. This study also brought about conversations of the national use of leaded aviation fuel in piston engined aircraft, which contributes to 70% of airborne lead.

A 2021 study by Dr. Sammy Zahran found unsafe levels of lead in the air above the southeastern side of the airport, exceeding the acceptable limit set by the National Ambient Air Quality Standards; in response, that side of the airport was closed to visitors. A study commissioned by the county and released in August 2021 found elevated blood lead levels in children living within a 1.5 miles radius of the airport. The study found that children in the affected region experienced blood lead levels of 0.83 micrograms per deciliter. This is nearly double the blood lead levels of children during the Flint water crisis, which were around 0.45 micrograms per deciliter. Nationally, over 360,000 children live in neighborhoods surround airports which use leaded aviation fuel.

Fixed-base operators (FBOs) 

At Reid–Hillview, fixed-base operators (FBOs) compete for fuel sales, aircraft rentals and/or flight training.
 AeroDynamic Aviation, formerly Amelia Reid Aviation
 Air Accord
 The Flying 20's
 Nice Air Aviation
 San Jose Fuel Company
 Squadron 2 Flying Club
 Trade Winds Aviation
 Victory Aero Maintenance

Ground transportation 
Capitol Expressway (County Route G21) is at the entrance to the airport at Cunningham Avenue.

Rental cars/taxi 
Enterprise car rental is available on the field next to the Airport Shoppe. Nice Air also has rental vehicles.

Bus 
The Santa Clara Valley Transportation Authority (VTA) has its Eastridge Transit Center across Tully Road at Eastridge Mall, about a half-mile walk southbound along Capitol Expressway.

VTA has plans for a bus rapid transit line from the Diridon train station in downtown San Jose to the Eastridge Transit Center. Further plans with less certain funding include a light rail extension from the Alum Rock station to Eastridge. In both cases, the segment along Capitol Expressway would serve Reid–Hillview Airport.

Other airport amenities 
As of a few years ago, Reid–Hillview Airport had vending machines, a pilot's lounge and break room. Santa Clara County passed a new law stating the terminal would no longer allow unhealthy food or drinks to be sold inside. This meant that coffee and all the vending machines that used to be there would no longer exist in the terminal. Now, all that remains is a water drinking fountain and bathrooms. However, there is still a seating area inside the terminal.

See also 

 Alum Rock Airport, historical airport nearby in Alum Rock from 1919 to approximately 1936
 Amelia Reid
 List of attractions in Silicon Valley
 Palo Alto Airport
 San Jose International Airport
 San Martin Airport

References

External links
 Reid–Hillview Airport (official site)
 Reid–Hillview Airport Association
 Experimental Aircraft Association (EAA) Chapter 62 – local chapter of the Experimental Aircraft Association
 Santa Clara Valley Chapter of Ninety-Nines – local chapter of the Ninety-Nines International organization for women pilots
 Civil Air Patrol Squadrons based at RHV: search & rescue, aerospace education
 Squadron 80 – senior squadron, adult volunteers
 Squadron 36 – cadet squadron, youth volunteers
 Live webcam at AeroDynamic Aviation
 Photos and video
 search for "reid-hillview airport" at Flickr
 search for "reid-hillview airport" at WebShots
 search for "reid-hillview airport" at YouTube
  Approval Of Noise Compatibility Program for Reid–Hillview Airport, San Jose, CA at Environmental Protection Agency
 
 

Buildings and structures in San Jose, California
Transportation in San Jose, California
Airports in Santa Clara County, California
Airports established in 1937